is a Japanese film director and screenwriter.

Filmography

Director
2004 School Wars: Hero
1995 Gokudo no onna-tachi: Akai kizuna
1994 Shinonomerō onna no ran
1990 Nozomi Witches (live-action)
1988 Crazy Boys
1985 Dan Oniroku kinbaku manji-zeme
1984 Dan Oniroku nawazeme
1983 Jotei aka Empress
1981 Danpu wataridori
1979 Tenshi no Yokubō
1976 Ooku ukiyo-buro
1975 Kōshoku: Genroku (maruhi) monogatari

References

External links

Japanese film directors
People from Kyoto
1942 births
Living people